In linear algebra, two n-by-n matrices A and B are called consimilar if

for some invertible  matrix , where  denotes the elementwise complex conjugation. So for real matrices similar by some real matrix , consimilarity is the same as matrix similarity. 

Like ordinary similarity, consimilarity is an equivalence relation on the set of  matrices, and it is reasonable to ask what properties it preserves. 

The theory of ordinary similarity arises as a result of studying linear transformations referred to different bases. Consimilarity arises as a result of studying antilinear transformations referred to different bases. 

A matrix is consimilar to itself, its complex conjugate, its transpose and its adjoint matrix.  Every matrix is consimilar to a real matrix and to a Hermitian matrix.  There is a standard form for the consimilarity class, analogous to the Jordan normal form.

References
 
  (sections 4.5 and 4.6 discuss consimilarity)

Matrices